Nicasio Safadi Reves (Reves is the translation of Rbeiz) (1902 – October 29, 1968 in Guayaquil) was an Ecuadorian musician 

Born in the Ottoman Empire, he went to Ecuador when he was five years old. He learnt to play the vihuela, the tiple, the guitar, the lute and the mandolin. He was in several musical groups before he joined Enrique Ibáñez in "Dúo Ecuador".

References

1902 births
1968 deaths
Ecuadorian musicians
Emigrants from the Ottoman Empire to Ecuador